Salinas Records is a Detroit, Michigan-based punk rock record label established in 2003 by Marco Reosti.
Reosti initially did not have any intentions to start a label, only aiming to release a 7-inch for his own band. He put the name of author John Steinbeck's hometown on the back cover, inadvertently providing a company name for future releases.

Notable artists
All Dogs
The Ambulars
Bonny Doon
Delay
Dyke Drama
The Goodbye Party
Joyride!
Martha
The Measure (SA)
P.S. Eliot
Radiator Hospital
Swearin'

References

Record labels based in Michigan
Record labels established in 2003
2003 establishments in Michigan